Dmytro Yuriyovych Tereshchenko (born 4 April 1987) is a Ukrainian professional footballer who plays for Dnepr Mogilev. He spent his entire senior career in Belarus, after relocating there in 2004.

External links

1987 births
Living people
People from Pavlohrad
Sportspeople from Dnipropetrovsk Oblast
Ukrainian footballers
Association football midfielders
Ukrainian expatriate footballers
Expatriate footballers in Belarus
Ukrainian expatriate sportspeople in Belarus
FC Dnepr Mogilev players
FC Dinamo Minsk players
FC Belshina Bobruisk players
FC Gomel players